Olin Bashford Smith (March 25, 1900 - May 4, 1966) was a professional American football player, who played in 8 games, in the early National Football League for the Cleveland Bulldogs in 1924. Prior to his professional career, he played at the college level at Ohio Wesleyan University. In 1962, Smith was inducted into the school's Athletic Hall of Fame.

References

External links
Ohio Wesleyan University Athletics Hall of Fame

1900 births
1966 deaths
Players of American football from Ohio
Ohio Wesleyan Battling Bishops football players
Cleveland Bulldogs players
People from Henry County, Ohio